Oxyrhopus fitzingeri, Fitzinger's false coral snake, is a species of snake in the family Colubridae.  The species is native to Ecuador and Peru.

References

Oxyrhopus
Snakes of South America
Reptiles of Ecuador
Reptiles of Peru
Reptiles described in 1845
Taxa named by Johann Jakob von Tschudi